General Wolfe Elementary School may refer to:

General Wolfe Elementary School (Vancouver), Vancouver, British Columbia
Wolfe Street Academy, formerly the General Wolfe Elementary School, part of the Baltimore City Public Schools